Făurei is a commune in Neamț County, Western Moldavia, Romania. It is composed of four villages: Budești, Climești, Făurei and Micșunești.

References

Communes in Neamț County
Localities in Western Moldavia